Robert Frederick Sink (April 3, 1905 – December 13, 1965) was a senior United States Army officer who fought during World War II and the Korean War, though he was most famous for his command of the 506th Parachute Infantry Regiment, part of the 101st Airborne Division, throughout most of World War II, in France, the Netherlands, and Belgium.

Early career

Sink attended Duke University (then known as Trinity College) for one year before securing an appointment to the United States Military Academy. He graduated 174th in West Point's 203-member class of 1927 (Cullum Number 8196). Commissioned as an Infantry officer, Second Lieutenant Sink was assigned to the 8th Infantry Regiment in Fort Screven, Georgia.

Sink later took assignments in Puerto Rico (1929, 65th Infantry Regiment), at the Army Chemical Warfare School (1932), at Fort Meade (1932), 34th Infantry Regiment, with the Civilian Conservation Corps (1933) at McAlevys Fort, Pennsylvania, and returned to the 34th Infantry Regiment before heading off to attend the United States Army Infantry School at Fort Benning, Georgia (1935).

In November 1937, after assignment to the 57th Infantry Regiment at Fort William McKinley in the Philippines, Sink returned to the United States and was assigned to the 25th Infantry Regiment at Fort Huachuca, Arizona, where he served as company commander and then as regimental operations officer.

World War II
In 1940, Sink was assigned to the 501st Parachute Infantry Battalion at Fort Benning. He became one of the four percent of the army's paratroopers qualified as a master parachutist and celebrated his birthday each year by making another jump.

Sink later commanded the 503rd Parachute Infantry Battalion and (later) Regiment. In July 1942, he was named as commander of the 506th Parachute Infantry Regiment at Camp Toccoa, Georgia; Fort Benning, Georgia; and Fort Bragg, North Carolina. Sink commanded the 506th throughout World War II, turning down two promotions during the war to remain with the unit. (The regiment was sometimes referred to as the "Five-Oh-Sink".) He closely monitored and sponsored the career of Major Richard Winters. He made two combat jumps in command of the 506th (D-Day and Operation Market Garden), and commanded the regiment at Bastogne during the Battle of the Bulge.

Postwar career
On August 12, 1945, Sink was named assistant division commander of the 101st Airborne Division. In December 1945, Sink returned to the United States, and the following month assumed command of the infantry detachment of the United States Military Academy. He entered the National War College at Fort Lesley J. McNair in Washington, D.C. in August 1948, graduating in June 1949. Sink then was transferred to the Ryukyus Command, and became chief of staff in October 1949. In January 1951, he was named assistant division commander of the 7th Infantry Division in Korea.

Sink returned to the United States and became assistant division commander of the 11th Airborne Division at Fort Campbell, Kentucky, in December 1951. In February 1953, he assumed command at the 7th Armored Division at Camp Roberts, California. In November 1953, he became commanding general of the 44th Infantry Division at Fort Lewis, Washington. In October 1954, Sink was assigned to the Joint Airborne Troop Board at Fort Bragg, North Carolina. In early 1955, he was transferred to Rio de Janeiro, Brazil, and in April 1955 assumed the dual functions of chairman of the United States Delegation to the Joint Brazil-United States Military Commission and chief of army section, Military Assistance Advisory Group, Brazil.

Sink returned to the United States and assumed command of the XVIII Airborne Corps and Fort Bragg in May 1957. In May 1958, he was announced as commander, Strategic Army Corps (STRAC), United States Army. His last major role was as commander of U.S. forces in Panama (CinC, Caribbean Command, Quarry Heights, Canal Zone), a post he held until his retirement in 1961 due to poor health.

Sink retired in 1961 as a lieutenant general. He died at Fort Bragg in December 1965 of pulmonary emphysema and was interred in Arlington National Cemetery. Sink was married and had three children.

Awards and decorations

Dates of rank
 United States Military Academy cadet – Class of 1927

Legacy

LTC Robert F. Sink Library at Fort Campbell, Kentucky, was dedicated in 1967.
COL. Robert Sink Memorial Trail up Currahee Mountain in Toccoa, Georgia, was dedicated on November 4, 2000.

In popular culture
The character of "Colonel Robert Stout" in the film A Bridge Too Far (1977), played by Elliott Gould, is based on Sink.
Robert Sink was portrayed in the HBO/BBC miniseries Band of Brothers (2001) by Vietnam veteran and retired U.S. Marine Corps Captain Dale Dye (also the military advisor on the series).
Robert Sink was also portrayed in the video game Brothers in Arms: Hell's Highway, also played by Dale Dye.

References

1905 births
1965 deaths
United States Army personnel of World War II
Band of Brothers characters
Duke University Trinity College of Arts and Sciences alumni
United States Army Infantry Branch personnel
People from Lexington, North Carolina
Recipients of the Croix de guerre (Belgium)
Recipients of the Croix de Guerre (France)
Recipients of the Legion of Merit
Recipients of the Silver Star
Companions of the Distinguished Service Order
Recipients of the Air Medal
Recipients of the Bronze Lion
Military personnel from North Carolina
United States Army generals
United States Military Academy alumni
Burials at Arlington National Cemetery